Japanese military operations other than war (MOOTW) focus on deterring war, resolving conflict, promoting peace, and supporting civil authorities in response to domestic crises.

The military in Japan is affected by Japan's pacifist post-war constitution.  The initial decision to participate in UN peacekeeping missions was not uncontroversial, and its continuing role in international affairs continues to be qualified.

Select Japanese deployments

 Anti-piracy operations, 2009–Present: Maritime Self-Defense Forces, 8 flotillas have patrolled coastal waters near Somalia.
 Iraq War ("Operation Enduring Freedom"), 2003-2009: Ground Self-Defense Forces, water purification near Basra; Air Self-Defense Forces,  cargo and personnel transport; Maritime Self-Defense Forces, supply ships servicing the international flotilla .

Notes

References
 Dobson, Hugo. (2003). Japan and United Nations peacekeeping: new pressures, new responses. London: Routledge. 
 Ministry of Foreign Affairs of Japan (MOFA): UN Peacekeeping Operations (PKO) and other International Peace Cooperation;  Japan's Contribution to UN Peacekeeping Operations

Peacekeeping
Military operations other than war
Military of Japan